Asperdaphne laceyi is a species of sea snail, a marine gastropod mollusc in the family Raphitomidae.

Description
The length of the shell attains 16 mm, its diameter 5 mm.

Distribution
This marine species occurs off Hong Kong

References

 Liu J.Y. [Ruiyu] (ed.). (2008). Checklist of marine biota of China seas. China Science Press. 1267 pp

External links
  Sowerby III, G. B. (1889 ("1888")). Descriptions of fourteen new Species of Shells from China, Japan, and the Andaman Islands, chiefly collected by Deputy Surgeon-Gen. R. Hungerford. Proceedings of the Zoological Society of London. : 565-570, pl. 28
 

laceyi
Gastropods described in 1889